Nergal crater is a crater on Jupiter's moon Ganymede. It has a distinctive ejecta blanket surrounding it that's darker nearer the craters and brighter further away. The inner region of the ejecta is characterized by a lobate appearance indicative of the flow of a liquid (or slushy) substance over the surface. The flow was probably icy surface material melted by the energy released during the impact that formed the crater.

The crater is named after the Sumerian god of war, death, disease.

Impact craters on Ganymede (moon)